Peeter Pruus (born 16 July 1989) is an Estonian cyclist, who last rode for UCI Mountain Bike Team Torpado Südtirol International.

Major results

2014
 5th Time trial, National Road Championships
2015
 1st  Overall Tour of Borneo
1st  Mountains classification
1st Stage 5
 9th Memoriał Henryka Łasaka
 10th Puchar Uzdrowisk Karpackich
 10th Memorial Grundmanna I Wizowskiego
2016
 1st  Cross-country marathon, European Mountain Bike Championships
 2nd Puchar Uzdrowisk Karpackich
 5th Overall Baltic Chain Tour
2017
 6th Overall Tour of China II
 7th Overall Tour of Estonia
1st  Mountains classification
 8th Szlakiem Wielkich Jezior
2019
 2nd Road race, National Road Championships
 3rd  Cross-country marathon, UEC European Mountain Bike Championships
 6th Overall Tour of Estonia
2020
 National Mountain Bike Championships
1st  Cross-country
1st  Cross-country marathon
2022
 7th Overall Tour of Estonia

References

External links

1989 births
Living people
Estonian male cyclists
People from Rapla
Olympic cyclists of Estonia
Cyclists at the 2020 Summer Olympics